The Terradyne Armored Vehicles Gurkha (or Terradyne Gurkha for short) is a tactical armored vehicle built by Ontario-based Terradyne Armored Vehicles Inc. The Gurkha is available in three different variants, each of which is built on a Ford F-550 Super Duty chassis.

History
The Gurkha was developed in 2005 by Armet Armored Vehicles. In 2011, the Gurkha vehicle design was purchased by Terradyne Armored Vehicles. The name is a homage to the Gurkhas, Nepali soldiers who serve in the British Army.

Terradyne incorporated in August 2011 as a subsidiary of Magna International.  In 2014 Terradyne became a privately owned company with no changes to staff or location.

Variants

Light Armored Patrol Vehicle (LAPV)
Application: Border patrol/law enforcement/government agencies/private security/tactical medic vehicle

Multi-purpose Patrol Vehicle (MPV)
Application: Purpose built for government and law enforcement agencies only 

Rapid Patrol Vehicle (RPV)
Application: Critical infrastructure protection/law enforcement/government agencies/military/border patrol

Civilian Limited Edition Vehicle (CLEV)
Application: Company PR vehicle/daily driver/rolling panic room/executive protection/offroad vehicle/hobby vehicle

Operators

 Alberta 
 British Columbia: Used by Victoria Police Department

 Manitoba: Used by Winnipeg Police Service and Regina Police Service.
 Nova Scotia: Purchased by the Halifax Police Service. Announced to be delayed due to COVID-19 on May 11, 2020. Contract canceled as of June 2020.
 Ontario
 Saskatchewan

Lučko Anti-Terrorist Unit

 Bank of Estonia (Eesti Pank)
 Estonian Police (Eesti Politsei)

 United Nations Development Programme (PMO) 

 Fuerza Civil: Nuevo León State Police, known as Fuerza Civil (Civil Force)
 Fuerza Civil: Veracruz (Civil Force)
 Guadalupe SSP
 GROMS Policia Saltillo: Grupo de Reacción Operativa, known as GROMS in Saltillo

 Nigeria Police Force

 Counter-Terrorism Battalion

Rojava US-led international coalition to counter ISIS provided the Kurdish-led Syrian Democratic Forces with Gurkha vehicles to be used in Raqqa offensive against ISIS.

 Singapore Police Force: Gurkha Contingent

 Ministry of Interior

 Arizona
 California
 Colorado: Used by Boulder Police Department.
 Florida
 New York
 Tennessee 
 Texas
 Virginia
Arlington County Police Department
Metropolitan Washington Airports Authority Police Department
 Wisconsin

 
13 from Canada

Former operators

	
 Victoria Police Special Operations Group: Known as the Armet Balkan Mk7 tactical response vehicle. Replaced in April 2013 by the Lenco BearCat.

References

External links
 Terradyne Armored Vehicles

Armoured cars
Armoured personnel carriers of Canada
Military light utility vehicles
Military trucks of Canada
Paramilitary vehicles